Benalbanach was the name of five ships operated by the Ben Line.

, in service 1940–43
, in service 1947–63
MV Benalbanach, in service 1967–72
MV Benalbanach, in service 1974–78
MV Benalbanach, in service 1981–84

Sources
The Ships List

Ship names